Jimmy Neutron, a fictional character, may also refer to:

 Jimmy Neutron: Boy Genius, the 2001 animated film
  The Adventures of Jimmy Neutron, Boy Genius, a television series spin-off of the film
 Jimmy Neutron: Boy Genius (video game), a video game based on the film